Carpi is an Italian town and comune of about 71,000 inhabitants in the province of Modena, Emilia-Romagna. It is a busy centre for industrial and craft activities and for cultural and commercial exchanges.

History
The name "Carpi" is derived from carpinus betulus, a hornbeam tree particularly widespread in medieval times in the Po valley region. In Prehistoric times it was a settlement of the Villanovan Culture.

The foundation by the Lombard king Aistulf of St. Mary's church in the castle (Castrum Carpi) in 752 was the first step in the current settlement of the city. From 1319 to 1525 it was ruled by the Pio family, after whom it was acquired by the Este, as part of the Duchy of Modena.

The city received a Silver Medal for Military Valour in recognition of its participation in the resistance against the German occupation during World War II.

The town has one of the largest squares in all Italy (3rd place), the heart of the city, Piazza dei Martiri. It is surrounded by the castle, the cathedral, the town hall and a 52 arches long portico. Usually every Thursday and Saturday the square hosts the local market.

Carpi used to be the finishing point of the annual Italian Marathon, which begins in nearby Maranello. Almost 1000 athletes enter the senior men's and women's race which has been held every year since 1988 in honor of Dorando Pietri, a long distance runner born in Carpi that lost his Olympic Gold Medal for being helped to stand up after a fall near the finish line.  
The area was crippled in the earthquakes of May 2012.

Title 
As a titular Duke of Modena, the current holder of the title of "Prince of Carpi" would be Prince Lorenz of Belgium, Archduke of Austria-Este.

Geography
Located in the northern area of its province, at the borders with the one Reggio Emilia, Carpi borders with the municipalities of Campogalliano, Cavezzo, Correggio (RE), Fabbrico (RE), Modena, Novi di Modena, Rio Saliceto (RE), Rolo (RE), San Prospero and Soliera.

It counts the hamlets (frazioni) of Budrione, Cantone di Gargallo, Cibeno Pile, Cortile, Fossoli, Gargallo, Lama di Quartirolo, Migliarina, Osteriola, San Marino, San Martino Secchia and Santa Croce.

Demographics

Main sights
Carpi is distinguished by its great Renaissance square (piazza), called Piazza Martiri https://www.tripadvisor.com/Attraction_Review-g670816-d4380076-Reviews-Piazza_dei_Martiri-Carpi_Province_of_Modena_Emilia_Romagna.html the largest in the region. It is flanked by a portico with 52 columns.

Other notable landmarks include:
Town hall (Palazzo dei Pio) - formerly the castle of the Pio family. It includes parts from different ages, such as the merloned-tower of Passerino Bonaccolsi, the Renaissance façade and the tower of Galasso Pio, and the 17th century watch tower. It includes a chapel frescoed by Bernardino Loschi and Vincenzo Catena.
Carpi Cathedral - Originally designed by Baldassarre Peruzzi, drawings for it are located in the Gabinetto dei Disegni e Stampe in the Uffizi, Florence, and document Peruzzi's contact with Leonardo da Vinci. Construction begun 1514, Baroque façade added in 1701 and cupola completed 1774).
Church of Santa Maria in Castello or La Sagra - façade (1514) designed by Peruzzi .
Church of Santa Chiara 
Church of Santissimo Crocifisso
Church of San Bernardino Realino
Church of San Bernardino da Siena
Church of San Nicolò, Carpi''' 
Church of Sant'Ignazio- home of the Museum of the Diocese of Carpi
Church of San Francesco d'Assisi

Sports
The biggest football team in Carpi is Carpi FC 1909 who play in the 5510 capacity Stadio Sandro Cabassi. Carpi FC 1909 played in Serie B during the 2013–14 season, achieving a 12th-place finish ensuring second tier football remained in the town for another season. On April 28, 2015, the club clinched promotion to Serie A for the first time in its history.
On 2016 the born in Carpi world champion swimmer Gregorio Paltrinieri won Gold Medal on 1 500 free style at Brazil Olympics.

Notable people
 Jacopo Berengario da Carpi (1460-1530), physician
 Ermes Effron Borgnino, known as Ernest Borgnine (1917 - 2012), U.S. actor, was the son of Anna Boselli (1894–1949) who was born in Carpi
 Camilla Pio di Savoia, (1440-1504) founder of Santa Chiara at Carpi
 Liliana Cavani (born 1933), film director and screenwriter
 Alida Chelli (1943-2012), actress
 Roberto Corradi (born 1975), former footballer
 Ciro Menotti (1798-1831), patriot
 Gregorio Paltrinieri (born 1994), swimmer
 Galasso I Pio (d.1367), Prince of Carpi
 Alberto III Pio (1475-1531), prince and humanist
 Rodolfo Pio da Carpi (1500-1564), cardinal and humanist
 Bernardino Ramazzini (1633-1714), physician
 Carlo Rustichelli (1916-2004), composer
  (1950-2007), fashion photographer

See also
Fossoli concentration camp
Cassa di Risparmio di Carpi

References

External links

 Carpi official website
Carpi at Emilia Romagna Turismo (in English)

 
Cities and towns in Emilia-Romagna
Castles in Italy
Villanovan culture